is a Japanese film director from Kumamoto. He served as assistant director on Shunji Iwai's Love Letter, April Story, and Swallowtail Butterfly.

Filmography

Director
 Open House (1998)
  (Sunflower) (2000)
 A Closing Day (閉じる日) (2000)
 Luxurious Bone (贅沢な骨) (2001)
 Go! (2001)
 Rock 'n' Roll Missing (2002)
 Justice (2002)
  (Sinking into the Moon) (2002)
 Kanon (TV, 2003)
 Seventh Anniversary (2003)
  (2003)
  (2004)
 Kita no Zeronen (Year One in the North) (2005)
 Spring Snow (2005)
 Toku no Sora ni Kieta (Into the Faraway Sky) (2007)
 Closed Note (2007)
 A Good Husband (今度は愛妻家) (2009) 
 Parade (2010)
 Five Minutes to Tomorrow (2014)
 Pink and Gray (2016)
 Pigeon (2016)
 Narratage (2017)
 River's Edge (2018)
 The Cornered Mouse Dreams of Cheese (2020)
 Theatre: A Love Story (2020)
 Revolver Lily (2023)

Awards and nominations

Awards

2000: FIPRESCI Prize: Himawari
2001: Hochi Film Award: Best Film Go!
2001: Nikkan Sports Film Award: Best Director Go!
2002: Award of the Japanese Academy: Best Director for Go!
2002: Blue Ribbon Award: Best Director for Go!
2002: Kinema Junpo Award: Best Director and Film for Go!
2002: Golden Star: Go!
2002: FIPRESCI Prize: Go! - Palm Springs International Film Festival
2002: Festival Prize: Best Director for Go!
2010: "Fipresci Prize" - 2010 (60th) Berlin International Film Festival

Awards nominated

2005: Award of the Japanese Academy: Best Director for Crying Out Love, In the Center of the World
2006: Award of the Japanese Academy: Best Director for Kita no zeronen

References

External links 
 
 Isao Yukisada's JMDb Listing (in Japanese)

1968 births
Living people
People from Kumamoto Prefecture
Japan Academy Prize for Director of the Year winners
Japanese film directors